Salty commonly refers to:

 High concentration of salt
 Salinity, the saltiness of a liquid
 Saltiness, one of the basic tastes

People
 Salty Parker (1912–1992), baseball player and coach 
 Salty du Rand (1926–1979), South African rugby player
 Salty Saltwell (born 1924), baseball manager
 Jarrod Saltalamacchia (born 1985), baseball player

Characters
 Mister Salty, a character for advertising Nabisco Mr. Salty Pretzels
 Salty the Seal, a character in Disney's Pluto cartoons
 Salty, a diesel engine in Thomas the Tank Engine and Friends
 Salty the Parrot, first mate in Sinbad Jr. and his Magic Belt
 Salty, a character of the group Captain Bogg and Salty

Film
 Salty (film), a 1973 family film about a sea-lion
 Gun Shy (2000 film), a 2017 comedy film produced under the working title Salty

Other uses
 Salty (album), by The Mutton Birds
 Salty and Roselle#Salty, one of two guide dogs who led their owners out of the World Trade Center during the September 11 attacks
 Salty, slang for any ocean-going ship that enters the Great Lakes via the St. Lawrence Seaway.
 Internet slang for the feeling of resentment

See also 
 Saltwater crocodiles in Australia, colloquial "Saltie"
 Salt (disambiguation)
 Salty dog (disambiguation)
 Saltire (diagonal cross)